The Second Legislature of Quebec was the provincial legislature of Quebec, Canada from 1871 to 1875, following the general election of 1871.

The Conservative Party of Quebec held office throughout the term of the Legislature, but went through a succession of three leaders. Pierre-Joseph-Olivier Chauveau was Premier of Quebec from 1871 to 1873. Gédéon Ouimet was premier from 1873 to 1874, and Charles Boucher de Boucherville  was premier from 1874 to 1875.

The Liberal Party of Quebec formed the Official Opposition, under the leadership of Henri-Gustave Joly de Lotbinière.

The Legislature held four annual sessions, with the first session called on November 7, 1871. The Legislature was dissolved on June 7, 1875, leading to the 1875 general election on July 7, 1875.

Structure of the Legislature 

The Legislature of Quebec was created by the British North America Act, 1867.  It consisted of the Lieutenant Governor of Quebec, the Legislative Assembly and the Legislative Council.  The Lieutenant Governor was appointed by the Governor General of Canada for a term of five years.  The Legislative Assembly consisted of sixty-five members, elected in single-member constituencies by first-past-the-post elections.  The Legislative Assembly was to last for four years, subject to being dissolved earlier by the Lieutenant Governor.  The Legislative Council consisted of twenty-four members, appointed for life by the Government of Quebec.

The elections for the Second Legislature were conducted under the election law of the former Province of Canada, which were continued until such time as the Legislature of Quebec enacted a new election law, designed specifically for Quebec.

Elections and qualifications

Right to vote 

The right to vote in elections to the Legislative Assembly was not universal.  Only male British subjects (by birth or naturalisation),  aged 21 and older, were eligible to vote, and only if they met a property qualification. For residents of cities and towns, the qualification was being the owner, tenant or occupant of real property assessed at three hundred dollars, or at an assessed yearly value of thirty dollars.  For residents of townships and parishes, the requirements were either an assessment of two hundred dollars, or an assessed yearly value of twenty dollars.

Women were expressly prohibited from voting, "for any Electoral Division whatever".

Judges and many municipal and provincial officials were also barred from voting, particularly officials with duties relating to public revenue. Election officials were also barred from voting.

Voting at elections was done by open ballotting, where voters publicly declared their vote to the poll officials.

Qualification for the Legislative Assembly 

Candidates for the Legislative Assembly had to meet a significant property qualification.  A candidate had to own real property in the Province of Canada, worth at least £500 in British sterling, over and above any encumbrances on the property.

Qualification for the Legislative Council 

The qualifications for the members of the Legislative Council were the same as for the members of the Senate of Canada.

Those requirements were:
 Be of the full age of thirty years;
 Be a British subject, either natural-born or naturalised;
 Possess real property in Quebec worth at least $4,000, over and above any debts or incumbrances on the property;
 Have a net worth of at least $4,000, over and above debts and liabilities;
 Reside in Quebec;
 Reside in, or possess his qualifying real property, in the division he was named to represent.

The provisions of the British North America Act, 1867 did not explicitly bar women from being called to the Senate of Canada.  However, until the Persons Case in 1929, it was assumed that women could not be called to the Senate, and were thus also barred from the Legislative Council.  In any event, no woman was ever appointed to the Legislative Council.

Events of the Second Legislature 

The Conservatives under Premier Pierre-Joseph-Olivier Chauveau won a substantial majority in the 1871 election, although with a somewhat reduced seat count.  In spite of their electoral success, the Conservatives began to fracture between an ultramontane Catholic  wing and the traditional Parti Bleu supporters, who were more business oriented.  Chauveau continued in office until 1873, when he resigned upon being appointed to the Senate of Canada.

Chauveau was succeeded as Conservative leader and Premier by Gédéon Ouimet, who was had been elected to the Legislative Assembly in 1867 and served in Chauveau's Cabinet as Attorney General. Shortly into Ouimet's term a major political scandal broke, the Tanneries scandal, which turned on a land transaction carried out by the government.  Ouimet and three other members of the Cabinet resigned.

Ouimet was replaced as party leader and premier by Charles Boucher de Boucherville in 1874. De Boucherville replaced almost the entire Cabinet.

In addition to the political instability associated with the Tanneries scandal, the Second Legislature was also marked by a high number of by-elections.  Over the course of four years, there were twenty-four by-elections in the sixty-five seat Legislative Assembly.  Most of the by-elections were triggered by the 1874 federal election, the first federal election after the abolition of the dual mandate, which had allowed individuals to hold seats in both the federal Parliament and the provincial Assembly.  Several members of the Legislative Assembly resigned their provincial seats to run federally.  Amongst those who moved to federal politics was the young Wilfrid Laurier, who had been elected to the Legislative Assembly in 1871 for the riding of Drummond et Arthabaska. A number of other by-elections were triggered by the changes to the provincial Cabinet under the three premiers. At that time, a member of the Assembly who was brought into Cabinet part-way through the term of the Assembly had to resign and stand for re-election.

One significant legislative measure passed by the de Boucherville government was electoral reform.  The general elections of 1867 and 1871 had been conducted under the electoral laws of the former Province of Canada.  In the 1875 session, the government passed a new election law to replace the old statute and create an electoral framework designed solely for Quebec.  One of the key changes was that the new  elections law introduced the secret ballot in Quebec elections, replacing the old open ballot system which had previously been used, and which had required voters to publicly declare their vote to the polling officials.

In 1875, Premier De Boucherville called a general election.  The Conservatives were returned to office, albeit with a somewhat reduced majority.

Legislative Assembly

Party standings 

The 1871 election returned a majority in the Legislative Assembly for the Conservative Party, led by Premier Chauveau.

Members of the Legislative Assembly 

The following candidates were elected to the Legislative Assembly in the 1871 election. The Premiers of Quebec are indicated by Bold italics. Cabinet Ministers are indicated by Italics.

Reasons for Vacancies

By-elections 

There were twenty-four by-elections during the term of the Second Legislature. Cabinet ministers are indicated by italics.

Reasons for Vacancies

Legislative Council

Party standings 

The Legislative Council continued to have a strong Conservative majority during the term of the Second Legislature.

Members during the Second Legislature

The Premier of Quebec is indicated by Bold italics. Cabinet members are indicated by italics.

Vacancies of less than one month are not shown. 
† Died in office.
‡ Resigned on abolition of the dual mandate.

Executive Council during Second Legislature 

There were three different ministries during the term of the Second Legislature, under Premiers Chauveau (1871-1873), Ouimet (1873-1874), and Boucher de Boucherville (1874-1875).

First Quebec Ministry:  Chauveau Cabinet (1871-1873)

Premier Chauveau continued the same membership in his Cabinet following the 1871 election. Chauveau and four of the ministers were Members of the Legislative Assembly, while three were Members of the Legislative Council. In addition to being premier, Chauveau held other portfolios.

Second Quebec Ministry: Ouimet Cabinet (1873-1874)

Following Chauveau's resignation as premier, the Quebec Conservative party chose Gédéon Ouimet as party leader and thus Premier of Quebec.  No general election was called.  Ouimet installed a new Cabinet.  Ouimet and four of the Cabinet ministers were Members of the Legislative Assembly, while two sat in the Legislative Council.

Third Quebec Ministry:  Boucher de Boucherville Cabinet (1874-1875) 

As a result of the Tanneries scandal, Premier Ouimet and three Cabinet ministers resigned.  The Conservative party chose Boucher de Boucherville to be premier.  He replaced almost all of the Cabinet, retaining only Robertson as Treasurer. All of the Cabinet ministers were members of the Legislative Assembly, except the Speaker of the Legislative Council abs Boucher de Boucherville himself.

Leader of the Opposition 

Henri-Gustave Joly de Lotbinière continued as Leader of the Opposition throughout the Second Legislature.

Legislative sessions 

The Legislature had four annual sessions:

 First session: November 7, 1871 to December 23, 1871, with thirty-five sitting days.
 Second session: November 7, 1872 to December 24, 1872, with thirty-five sitting days.
 Third session: December 4, 1873 to January 28, 1874, with twenty-nine sitting days.
 Fourth and final session: December 3, 1874 to February 23, 1875, with forty-two sitting days.

The Legislature did not meet again prior to its dissolution on June 7, 1875.

References 

002